Dr Thomas Goodall Nasmyth FRSE DL JP DPH (28 February 1855 – 16 January 1937) was a Scottish physician, medical author and historian. He served as Medical Officer of Health for Fife, Kinross and Clackmannanshire. He was one of the first (1899) to link Bovine Tuberculosis to the human form, later leading to the widespread use of pasteurisation of milk. He was influential in the decision to bond whisky for 3 years

Life

He was born in Auchterderran in Fife on 28 February 1855 the son of Isabella Chisholm and her husband, James A. Nasmyth. who owned the Fife Coal Company. He graduated MB ChB from the University of Edinburgh in 1876. In 1886 he gained a Diploma in Public Health (DPH) from the University of Cambridge. He gained his DSc from the University of Edinburgh in 1887

In 1887 he was elected a Fellow of the Royal Society of Edinburgh. His proposers were Dr John Chiene, Sir Thomas Grainger Stewart, Peter Denny and Dr Kirk Duncanson. He resigned from the Society in 1908.

In 1889 he became Fife's first Medical Officer of Health and took up residence in Cupar. During World War I he oversaw medical issues at HM Factory, Gretna as the Administrative Medical Officer . Scotland's largest explosives factory.

In 1916 he was living at 27 Palmerston Place in Edinburgh's West End and also noted as having property, Torrie House  in Newmills, Fife. He retired to Edinburgh and died at his home, Canaan Lodge   on 16 January 1937. He was cremated at Warriston Crematorium, his ashes being buried  in Dean Cemetery. He was an early subscriber to the development of an Edinburgh Crematorium. The grave lies on the main east–west path of the first northern extension, slightly to the south-west of the central obelisk. He is buried with his wife and daughter Jenny McKillop (1883-1917) and  Violet Nicol Nasmyth née Denny (1859-1941).

Publications

Hints about the Prevention of Consumption (1899)
Milk-borne Diseases  (1899)
Report on Methods of Sewage Purification (1900)
The Kingdom: Its Characteristics and Distinguished Sons (1922) – A history of Fife
Annual Report on the Health and Sanitary Conditions of the County of Fife
A Manual of Public Health
The Geographical Distribution of Cancer in Scotland
Air of Coal Mines

Positions of Note
Deputy Lieutenant of Edinburgh
Justice of the Peace for Fife
Director of the Fife Coal Company
Director of the Commercial Bank of Scotland
Director of the Highland and Agricultural Society
Director of the Scottish National Housing Company Ltd.
Chairman of the Royal Maternity Hospital and Simpson Maternity Hospital
Convenor of the Deaconess Hospital Board
Board Member for the Royal Dick Veterinary College
Board Member of the Animal Diseases Research Association of Scotland
President of the Scottish Branch of the Medical Officers of Health Association
Town Councillor for Morningside, Edinburgh 1921 to 1929
Councillor to the British Medical Association 1906 to 1910

References

1855 births
1937 deaths
19th-century Scottish medical doctors
20th-century Scottish medical doctors
Scottish non-fiction writers
People from Fife
Alumni of the University of Edinburgh
Fellows of the Royal Society of Edinburgh
Burials at the Dean Cemetery